Mount Marty University is a private Benedictine university in Yankton, South Dakota.

Athletics
The Mount Marty athletic teams are called the Lancers. The university is a member of the National Association of Intercollegiate Athletics (NAIA), primarily competing in the Great Plains Athletic Conference (GPAC) since the 2000–01 academic year. The Lancers previously competed in the defunct South Dakota Intercollegiate Conference (SDIC) from 1995–96 to 1999–2000.

Mount Marty competes in 22 intercollegiate varsity sports: Men's sports include baseball, basketball, cross country, football, golf, soccer, tennis and track & field (indoor and outdoor); while women's sports include basketball, cross country, golf, soccer, softball, tennis, track & field (indoor and outdoor) and volleyball; and co-ed sports include archery, competitive cheer, competitive dance and shotgun sports.

Campus
Mount Marty University is in Yankton, South Dakota, a town of 15,000 people. Located on the bluffs of the Missouri River, the 80-acre campus has a mix of modern and historic buildings. The university also has locations in Watertown and Sioux Falls.

Student life
Mount Marty University enrolls over 1100 students of all faiths. Students come from 25 states and 5 foreign countries.

References

External links
 
 Official athletics website
 

Educational institutions established in 1936
Benedictine colleges and universities
Buildings and structures in Yankton, South Dakota
1936 establishments in South Dakota
Catholic universities and colleges in South Dakota
Great Plains Athletic Conference schools